Olesya Povh ( (Olesya Ivanivna Povkh); born 18 October 1987) is a Ukrainian former sprint athlete who specialized in the 100 metres. Her personal best times include 11.08 seconds in the 100 m, achieved in June 2012. She is an Olympic Games bronze medalist, World Championships bronze medalist, European Championships gold and silver medalist, and European Indoor Championships gold medalist.

Early life
Povh is Jewish, and was born in Dnipropetrovsk, Ukraine. She graduated from the Dnipropetrovsk State Institute of Physical Culture and Sports in 2010 and chose to focus on athletics full-time in 2011.

Career
Povh had her first year of international competition in 2010. She reached the semi-finals of the 60 metres at the 2010 IAAF World Indoor Championships and won a relay bronze medal with Ukraine at the 2010 European Team Championships. She gained selection for the 100 m at the 2010 European Athletics Championships and was eliminated in the semi-finals. However, she went on to have success at the competition as part of the Ukrainian 4 × 100 metres relay team: running with Nataliya Pohrebnyak, Mariya Ryemyen, and Yelyzaveta Bryzhina, the team won the gold medal in a national record time of 42.29 seconds – the fastest mark in the world that year. The team reprised their roles for the 2010 IAAF Continental Cup, representing Europe, and took the silver medal behind the Americas team.

Povh began 2011 with a 60 metres best run of 7.14 seconds, gaining selection for the 2011 European Athletics Indoor Championships. At the 2012 Olympic Games in London she and her teammates Khrystyna Stuy, Mariya Ryemyen, and Yelyzaveta Bryzhina won the bronze medals in the 4 × 100 metres relay by setting a new national record.

On the eve of the 2017 World Championships in Athletics, Povh failed a drug test and was suspended from competing in the championships. In March 2019, the CAS confirmed that Povh committed the anti-doping rule infractions and confirmed the UAF Executive Committee decisions about the disqualification of Povh for four years starting from 15 June 2016.

References

1987 births
Living people
Sportspeople from Dnipro
Ukrainian female sprinters
Olympic female sprinters
Olympic athletes of Ukraine
Athletes (track and field) at the 2012 Summer Olympics
Athletes (track and field) at the 2016 Summer Olympics
Olympic bronze medalists in athletics (track and field)
Olympic bronze medalists for Ukraine
Medalists at the 2012 Summer Olympics
World Athletics Championships medalists
World Athletics Championships athletes for Ukraine
European Athletics Championships medalists
Universiade medalists in athletics (track and field)
Universiade gold medalists for Ukraine
Medalists at the 2013 Summer Universiade
Ukrainian sportspeople in doping cases
Doping cases in athletics